SS Southern Cross was a steam-powered sealing vessel that operated primarily in Norway and Newfoundland and Labrador.

Background 

Pollux was designed by Colin Archer, the renowned Norwegian shipbuilder. Archer had designed and built Nansen's ship Fram, which in 1896 had returned unscathed from its long drift in the northern polar ocean during Nansen's "Farthest North" expedition, 1893–96.

Pollux was sold to the Norwegian explorer Carsten Borchgrevink in 1897 and renamed Southern Cross, for the Southern Cross Expedition.

Like several of the historic polar ships her post-expedition life was short; Southern Cross was sold in 1901 to Murray & Crawford, Glasgow, and took up seal hunting from Newfoundland. Southern Cross participated in every seal hunt from 1901 to 1914. In April 1914 was lost with all hands in a storm off the Newfoundland coast.

Southern Cross Expedition 

For the Southern Cross Expeditions, Carsten Borchgrevink purchased the steam whaler Pollux and renamed her Southern Cross. She was taken to Colin Archer's yard in Larvik and fitted out for the expedition. Engines were designed to Borchgrevink's specification, and fitted before the ship left Norway.

On December 19, 1898 Southern Cross made its first Antarctic expedition where it made marine history by breaking through the pack ice into the Ross Sea for the purpose of over-wintering on the Antarctic continent.

Although Markham cast doubts on her seaworthiness (perhaps to thwart Borchgrevink's departure), the ship fulfilled all that was required of her in Antarctic waters.

1914 Newfoundland Sealing Disaster 
The 1914 sealing fleet included both Southern Cross and SS Newfoundland (under Captain Westbury Kean). In addition to minor crew changes from 1913, the fateful decision to remove the wireless set and operator from Newfoundland was taken in order to cut costs.

The fleet left St. John's on March 13, 1914. Newfoundland lost 78 sealers from her crew when they were stranded on the ice for two nights. Just as the terrible news of the Newfoundland tragedy was reaching St. John's, Southern Cross fell out of normal communication. The people of Newfoundland remained hopeful that tragedy would not strike twice, as evidenced by the April 3 newspaper article below:

Unlike the tragedy of Newfoundlands crew, the disappearance of Southern Cross remained largely unexplained as no crewmen or record of the voyage survived. While a marine court of inquiry determined that the ship sank in a blizzard on March 31, little evidence exists to verify this. Oral tradition suggests that rotten boards gave out in the heavy sea and allowed the cargo to shift and capsize the steamer. Though the wreck of Southern Cross accounted for the greater human loss of the two shipwrecks, some historians argue that the emotional impact of the Newfoundland disaster was more intensely felt because of the horrific stories survivors were able to recount.

These two disasters together constitute what is referred to as the 1914 Newfoundland Sealing Disaster. A total loss of 251 lives from a country with a population of approximately 250,000 devastated families and communities. In his autobiographical book, Rockwell Kent describes the impact of the loss on Brigus, where many of the sealers from Southern Cross had lived. "It will pretty well clear out this place," said one resident of the ship's loss.  According to Kent "The dread of the loss of this steamer had passed almost to certainty and the mention of the house, the wife, the children, the hopes and ambitions of any of those on her became a tragedy."

Legislative Response 
In 1914–15, the government held a commission of inquiry to examine Newfoundland and Southern Cross sealing disasters. The commission's findings made it clear that sealers faced extraordinarily dangerous working conditions on the ice.

While legislation concerning the sealing industry had existed as early as 1873, most regulations concerned maintaining seal stock. In 1898 legislation put a limit on the number of men on each steamer, and one year later in 1899, some wage protection was instated for sealers.  Arguably as a result of the 1914 Sealing Disaster and subsequent inquiries, further legislation was put in place in 1916, aimed directly at improving the safety standards and well-being of sealers. The new measures prohibited men from working in the dark; prohibited captains from ordering their crewmen to travel so far as to not be able to return to the ship within the day, and provided for rocket signals, search parties, masters' and mates' certificates, medical officers, thermometers, barometers, and better food and compensation.

In response to speculation that Southern Cross sank because of overloading, the government prohibited any ship from returning from a hunt with more than 35,000 pelts, and the Minister of Fisheries began to mark "load lines" on sealing vessels. Any ship that returned to port with its "load line" below the water would be heavily fined.

Public response 
Public sympathy was very evident after the 1914 Newfoundland Sealing Disaster. By April 27, 1914, a disaster fund set up to aid survivors and their families amounted to  $88,550. It's notable that this was not limited to the sealing disasters; it was common practice in society at the time to respond to industrial accidents in this way.

In popular culture 
The vessel was the subject of the book Death on the Ice by Cassie Brown, and a 1991 National Film Board of Canada documentary I Just Didn't Want to Die: The 1914 Newfoundland Sealing Disaster.

To mark the 100th anniversary of the Newfoundland sealing disaster, an animated short entitled "54 Hours" was produced by the National Film Board of Canada.

A novel about the sinking by Tim B. Rogers titled The Mystery of the SS Southern Cross was published in 2014.

The loss of so many lives on Southern Cross has caused the incident to be written in a song entitled Southern Cross.

See also
List of Antarctic exploration ships from the Heroic Age, 1897–1922

References

Bibliography

External links 
 54 hours, National Film Board of Canada

Steamships of Norway
Icebreakers of Norway
Steamships of Canada
Icebreakers of Canada
Maritime incidents in March 1914
Shipwrecks of the Newfoundland and Labrador coast
Ships built in Arendal
1886 ships